The Niagara Purple Eagles men's soccer team is the men's college soccer team that represent Niagara University (Lewiston, New York, United States) and competes in the Metro Atlantic Athletic Conference (MAAC) of NCAA Division I. The Purple Eagles play their home games at Niagara Field on the campus of Niagara University. The team colors are purple PMS 268 and white.

History
The team played their first season in 1969, and joined the Metro Atlantic Athletic Conference (MAAC) in 1989.

In the 2012 season, the team won its first MAAC tournament title and the program's first NCAA play-in berth, losing against Michigan on the first round (1-3).

Roster

All-time school records
At the end of the 2014 season, the team holds an all time record of 257-390-64 overall and 68-101-21 in MAAC.
Most wins were obtained in the 2012 (13-2-4) season.
Most goals in a season were obtained in the 1970 (65) season.
Most goals scored and biggest margin of victory happened 19 September 1970: Niagara 17 - Canisius 0.
Most goals in a Single Game by a player Adrian Philip Humphries 19 September 1970 v. Canisius

All-time head coaches

NCAA Division I Playoffs

MAAC Season by season history since 2003 

This only includes conference games. 

In 2015-16, 2011-12, and 2007-08 every team made the playoffs.

Notable players
 
Anthony Di Biase, player of SC Toronto
Carl Haworth, player of Ottawa Fury FC
Micah Paulino, international player of the Guam national football team
Adel Rahman, international player of the Pakistan national football team and Achilles '29
Navid Rahman, international player of the Pakistan national football team and Achilles '29

References

External links

 
Men's soccer clubs in New York (state)
1969 establishments in New York (state)